Brendan Birmingham (born 2 May 1956 in Lusmagh, County Offaly) is an Irish retired sportsperson.  He played hurling with his local club Lusmagh and has been a member of the Offaly senior inter-county team from 1978 until 1986.

References

1956 births
Living people
Lusmagh hurlers
Leinster inter-provincial hurlers
All-Ireland Senior Hurling Championship winners
Offaly inter-county hurlers